Kibbutz Beth-El is a Christian Zionist community in Zichron Ya'akov, Israel. In 2003, its population was 800.

Kibbutz Beth-El has its community roots in Stuttgart, Germany. Emma Berger, a Christian who became devout following her recovery from a serious illness, brought a group of followers to Israel in 1963 and purchased land in Zichron Yaakov.

Economy
Beth-El Group owns seven factories and other businesses and is the second largest employer in Zichron Ya'akov after the local council.

Beth El's "CBRN" ("Chemical, biological, radiological and nuclear") air-filtration system, a device for combating poisonous gases,  can be operated by grid electricity, battery or manually in the event of an attack.

See also
 List of kibbutzim
 Hakhshara

References

Christian Zionism in Israel
German diaspora in Israel
Kibbutzim
Kibbutz Movement
Zikhron Ya'akov